Vítor Ilídio Castanheira Penas (born 7 September 1977), known as Castanheira, is a Portuguese retired footballer who played as a midfielder, and is the current assistant manager of Palmeiras.

He amassed Primeira Liga totals of 247 games and nine goals over the course of 13 seasons, mainly at the service of Braga (12 years).

Football career
Born in Chaves, Castanheira signed with S.C. Braga for the 1996–97 season, and would remain there for over 11 years, always in the Primeira Liga. His spell was a steady one as he was always counted on by several team coaches, and he was influential when Hungarian Miklós Fehér joined the club in 2000–01, providing ten assists as the striker scored 14 goals; he also served as co-captain during his stay.

Castanheira was a relatively important part of the squad that finished in fourth place in 2005–06, appearing in 17 league matches (no goals). Braga nearly missed out on qualification to the UEFA Champions League, and progressed through to the round-of-16 in the following campaign's UEFA Cup.

In January 2008, as his importance in the team was gradually diminishing, he was loaned to top division promotees Leixões SC, until the end of the season. The move was extended for the following campaign, after the Matosinhos side retained their league status on the very last matchday.

Castanheira was rarely used by Leixões in 2008–09, and was released by Braga at its closure. He returned to youth club G.D. Chaves after 18 years, with it now in the second level of Portuguese football – in a relegation-ending season. He signed with another team in division two shortly after, newly promoted Moreirense FC.

Aged nearly 35, Castanheira moved abroad for the first time, joining several compatriots at Cypriot club Doxa Katokopias FC. He retired the following year, immediately being appointed assistant coach at S.C. Braga B.

References

External links

National team data 

1977 births
Living people
People from Chaves, Portugal
Portuguese footballers
Association football midfielders
Primeira Liga players
Liga Portugal 2 players
Segunda Divisão players
S.C. Braga players
S.C. Braga B players
Leixões S.C. players
G.D. Chaves players
Moreirense F.C. players
Cypriot First Division players
Doxa Katokopias FC players
Portugal youth international footballers
Portugal under-21 international footballers
Portuguese expatriate footballers
Expatriate footballers in Cyprus
PAOK FC non-playing staff
Sportspeople from Vila Real District